Wolf Creek is a stream in Butler County in the U.S. state of Missouri. It is a tributary of Cane Creek.

Wolf Creek was named for the wolves in the area.

See also
List of rivers of Missouri

References

Rivers of Butler County, Missouri
Rivers of Missouri